SS Veendam was a 15,450 GRT ton ocean liner built for the Holland America Line. Built in 1922 by Harland & Wolff Limited, in Govan, Glasgow, she would operate on transatlantic routes between New York and Rotterdam via the Caribbean Sea. In 1941 she was seized by the Kriegsmarine as an accommodation ship and in 1945 after heavy damage, she was returned to her former owners the Holland America Line. She would go on to serve for another eight years before she was scrapped in 1953 at Baltimore, Maryland. She was the sister ship of SS Volendam.

Construction and Design 
Veendam was built by Harland and Wolff in Govan, Glasgow for the Holland America Line. She was launched on 18 November 1922 in yard 650 and would be completed on 20 March 1923.

For propulsion, she was powered by four Brown – Curtiss steam turbines that drove two screws.

Veendam was constructed out of steel and had four decks. Initially, passenger accommodation was divided into three classes, 263 in first class, 435 in second class and 1200 in third class. As for crew, she would usually carry a crew complement of 328.

History

Peacetime Service 
Veendam commenced her maiden voyage on 18 April 1923 from Rotterdam to New York. In 1923 she became to first Holland America Lines cruise to the Caribbean Sea from New York. On 15 July 1927, Veendam collided and sunk the Norwegian steamer Sagaland. Veendam was involved in another collision on 28 May 1928 when she was struck on the port side by the SS Castrico. The collision submerged the boiler room and the number four passenger deck. She was subsequently towed to Hoboken and repaired.

Wartime Service 

After the outbreak of the Second World War, she continued her transatlantic voyages between New York and Rotterdam. On 17 September 1939 alongside the British freighter Collingworth, she rescued survivors of the carrier HMS Courageous after she was sunk by a German U-boat. During the Battle of the Netherlands, she was caught in the crossfire between Dutch and German troops. This caused a crane to collapse and smash into the deck resulting in a minor fire of which was quickly extinguished. Unlike her sister ship Volendam, she was unable to avoid capture by Axis troops.

In January 1941 she was transferred to the Kriegsmarine and was converted into an accommodation ship for off-duty U-boat crews. During 1943 she was struck repeatedly by Allied bombs with one setting the ship on fire and severely damaging the engine room. On 31 December 1944, she would be set on fire again after another Allied bomb strikes the first class accommodation. She would be hit repeatedly until the Capture of Hamburg on 4 May 1945.

Postwar Service and Scrapping 
After the end of the Second World War, she was used as an accommodation ship for returning Dutch crews. Soon afterwards she was returned to the Holland America Line. However, the ship was in very poor shape as she was partially submerged and suffered heavy fire damage as a result of negligence and bomb damage. The ship was towed to Amsterdam and would finish repairs in 1947.  After the repairs, she continued operations as an Ocean liner and primarily ferried post-war immigrants between Europe and North America.

Fate 
On 30 October 1953 Veendam concluded her final voyage with 600 passengers in New York. She sailed under her own power to Baltimore and was scrapped on November 1953 by the Bethlehem Steel Company.

References

External links 
 SS Veendam passenger lists (1923 - 1948)
 Images related to the SS Veendam

1922 ships
Ships built in Govan
Ships built by Harland and Wolff
Ships of the Holland America Line
Steamships of the Netherlands